Georgios Neofytidis (born 28 July 2000) is a Greek professional footballer who last played as a defensive midfielder for NB I club Debrecen.

Career

Zemplín Michalovce
On 15 February 2020, Neofytidis made his Fortuna Liga debut for Zemplín Michalovce against AS Trenčín.

References

External links
 MFK Zemplín Michalovce official club profile 
 Futbalnet profile 
 
 

2000 births
Living people
Footballers from Thessaloniki
Greek footballers
Greek expatriate footballers
Greece youth international footballers
Association football midfielders
MFK Zemplín Michalovce players
FC ViOn Zlaté Moravce players
Slovak Super Liga players
Expatriate footballers in Slovakia
Greek expatriate sportspeople in Slovakia